At a Glance is a 2008 Italian thriller film written, directed and starred by Sergio Rubini. For his performance  Riccardo Scamarcio  won the 2008 Flaiano Prize for best actor.

Cast 
  
Riccardo Scamarcio as  Adrian
Sergio Rubini as Lulli
Vittoria Puccini as  Gloria
Paola Barale as  Sonia
 Flavio Parenti as  Claudio
 Sara D'Amario as  Iolanda 
 Fabrizio Romano as  Benny
 Giancarlo Ratti as  Nicola
Cristina Serafini as The Doctor 
 Emanuele Salce as  Righi

References

External links 

 
 
2008 thriller films
2008 films
Italian thriller films
Films directed by Sergio Rubini
Films scored by Pino Donaggio
2000s Italian films
2000s Italian-language films